Hazrat-e Soltan (also Romanized as Ḩaẕrat-e Solţān, Ḩaẕrat-esolţān, and Ḩaẕrat Solţān) is a village in Shahrestaneh Rural District, Now Khandan District, Dargaz County, Razavi Khorasan Province, Iran. At the 2006 census, its population was 96, in 27 families.

References 

Populated places in Dargaz County